Kenya competed at the 2004 Summer Paralympics in Athens, Greece. Their delegation included 16 athletes, 8 men and 8 women, who won 3 golds, 1 silver and 3 bronze medals.  Institutional problems inside Kenyan elite disability sport impact the country's performance at the Paralympic Games.

Team 
The Kenyan delegation included 8 men and 8 women. The 2004 Games were the ones with the largest number of women representing Kenya in the country's Paralympic history.

Background 
A number of factors have impacted the development of elite disability sport in Kenya in this period.  One factor was negative cultural attitudes towards people with disabilities in general that made it difficult to participate, even if the athlete had won a Commonwealth Games medal. A second variable was coaching issues.  These included  poor qualifications for coaches, lack of funding for coaches, inconsistent coaching or coaches having hidden agendas for being involved in para-sport, such as a desire to travel overseas.  A third issue was lack of available equipment to train with.  Part of this was because of the high cost of specialized equipment.  Another part was a desire not to spend money on people with disabilities as they are less worthy of the funding.  A fourth issue is that facilities are often not accessible to people with disabilities.  Sometimes, venues do not want to let people with disabilities use them.  Sometimes, facilities lack accommodations for people with disabilities.  A fifth problem was transportation.  Transportation around cities is often not handicap accessible, making it difficult for elite athletes to get to training venues.  Ethnic favoritism was a sixth problem impacting elite para-sport.  There was a perception among elite athletes that the government and sporting officials favored certain ethnic groups.  According to one elite athlete, for the 2000 Games, the team was dominated by ethnic Luo.  For the 2004 Games, the trend was towards ethnic Kikuyu.  In athletics, the preference tended to be towards Kalenjin.  The last major issue was lack of financial support for participating in sport at the elite level.  More Kenyans would have tried to represent their country at the Paralympic level, but they were unable to afford it despite the desire to do so.

The above existed against a broad issue about perceptions in Black Africa about people with disabilities. In many parts of Black Africa, people who have disabilities that include intellectual disabilities, and physical disabilities such as impairments and deformities often face cultural barriers to participation because of attitudes related to their disabilities.  These include beliefs that they acquired their disabilities because their parents were witches or they are wizards.  Their disability is often seen as a result of a personal failing on their part.  As such, there is often tremendous cultural pressure for people with physical disabilities to remain hidden and out of the public eye.  In many places, they are perceived to be monsters in need of healing. In a Kenyan context, the "bad blood" of people with disabilities is thought to also impact their families, creating further stigma for the person with the disability.

Medalists

Athletics

Men's track

Women's track

Women's field

Powerlifting

Men

See also
Kenya at the Paralympics
Kenya at the 2004 Summer Olympics

References 

Nations at the 2004 Summer Paralympics
2004
Summer Paralympics